Emily Joanna Carey (born 30 April 2003) is an English actress. She began her career as a child actor on stage and in the BBC One soap opera Casualty (2014–2017, 2021). She went on to play young versions of characters, such as Diana Prince in Wonder Woman (2017), Lara Croft in Tomb Raider (2018), and Alicent Hightower in the HBO fantasy series House of the Dragon (2022). She also appeared in BBC iPlayer teen series Get Even (2020).

Early life 
Carey was born in the London Borough of Barnet. Her family is in the theatre industry. When Carey was as young as three she would help her grandmother, a former West End wardrobe mistress, pair socks backstage. She was scouted by an agent when she was eight. She was invited by Michael Xavier, whom she met through The Sound of Music, to take weekend acting classes at his MX Masterclass, of which she is now a patron.

Career 

Carey began her career in 2013 in the West End production of Shrek The Musical at the Theatre Royal, Drury Lane and as Marta von Trapp in the Olivier Award-nominated The Sound of Music at Regents Park Open Air Theatre.

The following year, Carey joined the cast of Casualty as Grace Beauchamp, a role she would play until 2017 and reprise in 2021. She also appeared in the video for Idina Menzel and Michael Bublé's cover of "Baby, It's Cold Outside". She played Mary Conan Doyle in the ITV drama Houdini & Doyle.  Carey was listed in a Huffington Post article as one of the top five child stars of 2016.

Carey made her feature film debut as young Diana Prince (Wonder Woman) in the 2017 DC Universe film Wonder Woman. This was followed by a role as young Lara Croft in the 2018 Tomb Raider reboot film. She signed with IMG Models in 2019.

In 2020, Carey played Mika Cavanaugh in BBC iPlayer teen series Get Even, which was distributed internationally on Netflix, as well as the titular Anastasia in the film Anastasia: Once Upon a Time, also on Netflix. She voiced Anne Frank and Mila in the animated films Where is Anne Frank and Monster Family 2 respectively.

In July 2021, it was announced Carey had been cast as young Alicent Hightower (later played by Olivia Cooke) in the 2022 HBO fantasy series House of the Dragon, a Game of Thrones prequel and adaptation of George R. R. Martin's fictional history book Fire and Blood. She also portrayed Teen Wendy in the film adaption of Laurie Fox's novel The Lost Girls.

Personal life 
Carey identifies as queer and uses "she/they" pronouns. Carey helped The Children's Trust launch the #MyBrave campaign. She is in a relationship with musician Kellimarie Willis, who performs in the band RLY.

Filmography

Film

Television

Music videos

Stage

Video games

Notes

References

External links 
 

Living people
2003 births
21st-century English actresses
Actresses from London
English television actresses
English soap opera actresses
English film actresses
English stage actresses
English musical theatre actresses
English child actresses
IMG Models models
English LGBT actors
People from the London Borough of Barnet
Queer actresses